Podanur Junction(station code: PTJ) is a railway station in Podanur, Coimbatore, Tamil Nadu, India

History 
It was the first railway station in the Coimbatore district, Kongu Region or Western Region, which opened in 1862 and third oldest railway station in south India next to Royapuram and Tiruchirappalli Junction railway station. It serves one of the four way junction in India. It was served as one of the Railway Divisional Head Quarters of South Indian Railways which is named as Podanur Division, later in 1953 Podanur Division was dissolved and divisional head quarters was shifted to olavakot(now palakkad division) in kerala.

Administration 
The station is operated by the Southern Railway zone of the Indian Railways and comes under the Salem railway division. It is one of the important railway stations in Coimbatore with trains to any part of India and also one of the A graded stations in the Southern Railway. Before the gauge conversion between Podanur-Pollachi-Palani-Dindigul line in 2008, this station served as the important station for the connectivity of western Tamil Nadu to southern regions.

Lines 
The station has five platforms and a junction, joining lines going in four different routes: towards Coimbatore Junction, towards Irugur,  towards Pollachi and towards Palakkad.

Services 
This station handles long-distance trains and local trains.

Development 
After Podanur – Dindigul gauge conversion, trains planned to operated from Podanur Junction, to serve as a satellite railway station for Coimbatore city Junction. But still people demand to bring back the trains Coimbatore to Madurai, Coimbatore to Rameshwaram, Coimbatore to Sengottai in this line that was earlier running successfully before the gauge conversion.

Connections
The terminus is connected to all the major places within the city such as:

Town Hall - 6.3 km
Coimbatore Integrated Bus Terminus - 3.9 km
Gandhipuram Central Bus Terminus - 9.1 km
Singanallur Bus Terminus - 7.5 km
Ukkadam Bus Terminus - 5.0 km
Saibaba Colony Bus Terminus - 9.4 km
Coimbatore Junction - 6.4 km
Coimbatore International Airport - 13.7 km.

See also

Coimbatore Junction
Coimbatore North Junction railway station
Salem railway division
Coimbatore
Indian Railways
Transport in Coimbatore

References

External links
 The official website of Southern railway

Railway junction stations in Tamil Nadu
Railway stations in Coimbatore
Salem railway division
Railway stations opened in 1862

ta:போத்தனூர் (கோயம்புத்தூர்)